Shopee Pte. Ltd. (Shopee) is a Singaporean multinational technology company that specialises in e-commerce. The company was launched in Singapore in 2015, before it expanded abroad.

, Shopee is considered the largest e-commerce platform in Southeast Asia with 343 million monthly visitors. It also serves consumers and sellers across countries in East Asia (Taiwan) and Latin America who wish to purchase and sell their goods online.

Shopee is a subsidiary of Sea Limited.

History 
In February 2015, Shopee launched in Singapore as a social-first, mobile-centric marketplace where users can browse, shop and sell products. The asset-light platform is integrated with logistical and payment support, and claims to make online shopping easy and secure for both buyers and sellers.

The app-based platform launched a website to compete with other e-commerce companies such as Coupang, Lazada, Tokopedia and AliExpress. To differentiate itself, Shopee offers online shopping security through its own escrow service called Shopee Guarantee, which can be used to withhold payments from sellers until buyers have received their orders.

On 3 September 2019, Shopee officially opened its six-storey regional headquarters at Singapore Science Park. The new building spans  of space, which can accommodate 3,000 employees and is six times larger than Shopee's previous headquarters at Ascent Building. The building was leased by WeWork before it was relinquished to Shopee.

Shopee has yet to turn profitable despite increasing its gross profit margin year-on-year in the first half of 2022, attributed to faster growth in transaction-based fees and advertising income. Coupled with rising inflation and interest rates as well as setbacks on its internationalisation plans, Shopee laid off staff across multiple markets in June 2022, including employees from Indonesia, Thailand, and Vietnam. ShopeePay and ShopeeFood were also reported to be facing cuts.

On 15 September 2022, Sea's CEO, Forrest Li sent a memo to all employees that outlined cost-cutting measures to be taken by the company to achieve "self-sufficiency". The measures include restrictions on business expenses, and Shopee's top executives will also temporarily forgo compensation. Another round of job cuts was also announced, which affected employees in Singapore, Indonesia, and China.

Business model 
Shopee started as a consumer-to-consumer (C2C) marketplace but it pivoted into a C2C and business-to-consumer (B2C) hybrid model. 

The company partners with over 70 courier service providers across markets it serves to provide logistical support for users. In Singapore, Shopee collaborates with logistics startup Ninja Van for item pickup and delivery. Other delivery partners in the region include Pos Malaysia and Pos Indonesia. Shopee also partnered with Delhivery and Ecom Express for deliveries in India before it exited the domestic market.

In its early phases of growth, Shopee offered subsidies and free shipping to its users while delivery services were still expensive in the areas it serves.

Market share 

As of 2019, Shopee's app has recorded 200 million downloads. Gross orders also grew 92.7% to 246.3 million in Q2 2019, compared to 127.8 million a year ago. Its gross merchandise value (GMV) also surged 72.7% to US$3.8 billion in Q2 19, compared to US$2.2 billion a year ago.

According to a report by iPrice in Q2 2019, Shopee was the top shopping app base on monthly active users, total downloads and website visits, ahead of its competitors, Lazada and Tokopedia. These GMV claims led to backlash from Lazada. Lazada's former CEO, Max Bittner asserted that GMV numbers can be easily inflated "by subsidy schemes and history shows that GMV falls away as unhealthy subsidies are removed."

In Malaysia, Shopee became the third most visited e-commerce portal in Q4 2017, overtaking Lelong, and replaced Lazada as the top app on iOS and Google Play app stores.

Among consumers in Indonesia, a survey conducted in December 2017 revealed that Shopee is the top shopping platform for Indonesian mothers (73%), ahead of Tokopedia (54%), Lazada (51%) and Instagram (50%).

In 2019, Shopee entered the Latin America market when it launched a localised site in Brazil. It later started operations in Mexico, Chile and Colombia in 2021. In September 2021, Shopee introduced its marketplace in Poland. Launches in Spain and France followed over the next two months. Shopee exited France and Spain on 6 March and 17 June 2022 respectively, leaving only Poland with operations in Europe. Eventually, Shopee left Europe with an announcement of closure of its Polish operations on 12 January 2023.

Shopee started operations in South Korea as of 2020 to help local merchants reach customers in markets where the former operates. However, Shopee does not have a consumer-facing platform in South Korea. 

In November 2021, Shopee entered the Indian market with a soft launch. It clocked 100,000 orders a day and has over one million app installations on the Google Play Store in India. On 29 March 2022, just five months after the launch, Shopee ceased its operations in India. The website and app also went offline in India as of 31 May 2022.

For Q2 2022, Shopee recorded US$1.7 billion in quarterly revenue, higher than the combined revenue of Alibaba Group's international businesses: Lazada, AliExpress, Trendyol and Daraz.

In September 2022, Shopee ended its local operations in Chile, Colombia and Mexico, but would continue to serve customers in these countries through a cross-border model. Shopee exited Argentina entirely on 8 September 2022 after facing stiff competition with Mercado Libre.

New launches 
In 2016, Shopee launched an initiative called Shopee University, a series of workshops and tutorials to aid local entrepreneurs and businesses in setting up their online businesses in the Philippines.

In 2017, Shopee launched Shopee Mall with 200 brands in Singapore and the Philippines.The dedicated portal features thousands of products sold by leading brands and retailers in the region. Shopee Mall was created to offer a more diverse online shopping experience, and to better cater to larger brands looking to pursue an omni-channel approach.

In 2018, Shopee launched the China Marketplace portal that offers shoppers easy access to products from Chinese merchants, without any shipping and agent fees in Singapore and the Philippines. The portal competes with Lazada's Taobao Collection option.

In 2021, Shopee launched a social media customer service arm in the Philippines, known as Shopee Cares PH. The same year, Shopee launched a food delivery service in Indonesia called ShopeeFood, in partnership with over 500 merchants.

On 10 August 2022, cloud-based e-commerce company ChannelAdvisor announced that it will integrate with Shopee to allow its users to reach new customers by "extending their multichannel commerce strategies to new markets in the Asia Pacific region, while leveraging the efficiencies of a centralised platform".

Marketing

Brand ambassadors 
In 2018, Shopee appointed South Korean girl group Blackpink as its inaugural regional brand ambassador, as part of its partnership with YG Entertainment. Bambam from South Korean boy band Got7 was also appointed as the brand ambassador in Thailand in October of the same year.

In 2019, Shopee appointed professional footballer Cristiano Ronaldo as its regional brand ambassador. The partnership was announced in line with Shopee's signature annual shopping event, 9.9 Super Shopping Day.

In the Philippines, Shopee has engaged nine local brand ambassadors: Anne Curtis, Kim Chiu, Dingdong Dantes, Marian Rivera, singer Jose Mari Chan, boxer/former senator Manny Pacquiao, as well as television personalities Sarah Geronimo, Kris Aquino, Willie Revillame, and sisters Toni and Alex Gonzaga.

In August 2020, Gurmit Singh became Shopee's first Singaporean brand ambassador and reprised his character as Phua Chu Kang from a Singaporean sitcom for the role. Mark Lee was appointed as Shopee's next ambassador in May 2021.

In Indonesia, Shopee has recruited several brand ambassadors: singers Didi Kempot, Nella Kharisma, Via Vallen, Rizky Febian, Syahrini, rock band Slank, actor Maxime Bouttier, actress Prilly Latuconsina, former JKT48 member Melody Nurramdhani Laksani, and comedian Tukul Arwana. South Korean boy group Stray Kids took over as brand ambassador of Shopee in Indonesia for the 11.11 Big Sale and 12.12 Birthday Sale. In addition, soap opera actor and actress Arya Saloka and Amanda Manopo from RCTI soap opera Ikatan Cinta were signed as Shopee's local brand ambassadors in 2021. The same year, actor and martial artist Joe Taslim became Shopee's local brand ambassador for the 9.9 Super Shopping Day,

In June 2021, BtoB was appointed as the official ambassador for Shopee's K-Collection, a Korean brand exhibition where 50 domestic small and medium-sized enterprises introduced their products directly through Shopee Live across Singapore, Malaysia, Vietnam, and the Philippines, to attract K-pop fans to become customers.

In 2022, singer Nassar Sungkar took part in promotions for Shopee's SPayLater in Indonesia. Singer Lesti Kejora and actor-husband Rizky Billar was also signed as local brand ambassadors for the 4.4 Sambut Ramadan Sale. Internet celebrity couple Fuji An and Thariq Halilintar took part in ambassadorial work for Shopee Video in mid-2022. In October 2022, singer Happy Asmara became the brand ambassador for the Shopee 11.11 Big Sale campaign in Indonesia. In March 2023, comedian Komeng and singer Wika Salim signed as local brand ambassadors for the Shopee Big Ramadan Sale.

Sponsorships 
Shopee was the sponsor of Indonesia's top professional football division for men, the Liga 1, for its 2019 and 2020 seasons.

Awards 
In 2015, Shopee was awarded the Singapore Startup Of The Year in the second edition of Vulcan Awards, presented by digital publisher Vulcan Post.

Controversies

Meet-and-greet with Blackpink 
In June 2019, #ShopeeScam trended on Twitter after Shopee released a promotion in the Philippines that offered passes to a meet-and-greet with Blackpink for the top 568 spenders in their online store. Several fans reported receiving notifications that they had won tickets, but which were unilaterally retracted afterwards by Shopee. Others posted screenshots that showed Shopee changing their contest mechanics the day before the event. Shopee was investigated by the Department of Trade and Industry for the incident.

Underpaid couriers in Indonesia 
In April 2021, Shopee faced allegations that it was underpaying its couriers in Indonesia after some riders claimed publicly that their pay per delivered package was reduced by the company to US$0.10 per package, down from US$0.34 in the previous year. Couriers that serve Shopee Express deliveries were not paid basic monthly salaries too, though there is a US$7.90 bonus if they can deliver 40 or more packages in a single workday. There is also no compensation for fuel or parking fees. Shopee responded to the allegations that it has a fair incentive scheme that is in line with Indonesia's market and regulations, and what they offer is "highly competitive" within the industry.

Rescinded job offers 
In late August 2022, a user of Chinese social networking platform Maimai uploaded a post stating that he had relocated as part of a job offer from Shopee to work at the company's headquarters in Singapore. However, the offer was revoked after he disembarked from the plane in Singapore with his family. Multiple job offers were allegedly affected, as other users claimed they had similarly resigned from current positions and terminated housing contracts to join Shopee, only for their offers to be rescinded.

Toni Gonzaga endorsement 
In September 28, 2022, Shopee received a backlash when rumors started spreading that the platform will introduce Toni Gonzaga as its brand ambassador a day after the company's reported massive layoff. This was confirmed the following day at a press conference. While various reasons were pointed for the backlash from the ethical issues with getting a highly-paid endorser to the endorsers' political activities, Gonzaga only appeared in the company's platform for a total of ten days before introducing another endorser for their 11.11 campaign, businessman and singer Jose Mari Chan.

References

External links 
 Shopee website

Online retailers of Singapore
Retail companies established in 2015
Internet properties established in 2015
2015 establishments in Singapore
Singaporean brands